Eure-et-Loir is a French department, named after the Eure and Loir rivers. It is located in the region of Centre-Val de Loire. In 2019, Eure-et-Loir had a population of 431,575.

History
Eure-et-Loir is one of the original 83 departments created during the French Revolution on March 4, 1790 pursuant to the Act of December 22, 1789. It was created mainly from parts of the former provinces of Orléanais (Beauce) and Maine (Perche), but also parts of Île-de-France (Drouais, Thymerais, Valley of the Avre, Hurepoix).

The current department corresponds to the central part of the land of the Carnutes who had their capital at Autricum (Chartres).   The Carnutes are known for their commitment, real or imagined, to the ancient Druidic religion.   A holy place in the "Forest of the Carnutes" used to host the annual Druidic assembly.  In the north of the department another pre-Roman people, the little-known Durocasses, had their capital at Dreux.

Geography
Eure-et-Loir comprises the main part of the region of Beauce, politically it belongs to the current region of Centre-Val de Loire and is surrounded by the departments of Loir-et-Cher, Loiret, Essonne, Yvelines, Eure, Orne, and Sarthe.

Principal towns

The most populous commune is Chartres, the prefecture. As of 2019, there are 6 communes with more than 10,000 inhabitants:

Demographics
The inhabitants of the department are called Euréliens.

Economy 
The Eure-et-Loir is a department of agricultural tradition (Beauce), but also at the forefront in three economic sectors :

Agriculture 
The department is a major economic player in the production of grain and oilseed in France. Its agricultural economy is still heavily dependent on the economic and regulatory environment of the markets for crops. The Eure-et-Loir region is the first grain producer of France. It is also the national leader in the production of rapeseed and peas. 
Wheat production is by far the most dominant in the area. Nearly 40% of all farmland is devoted to the cultivation of wheat, which has generated an average of 29% of the commercial agricultural production of the department over the last 5 years.

The "Pôle AgroDynamic also promotes agriculture in the department", a grouping of subsidiaries providing added values in different sectors: agro-energy, agribusiness, agricultural materials, Agrohealth.

Industries 
 The Cosmetic Valley cluster, around Chartres, which is the most important centre of the French beauty and well-being (perfumes/cosmetics) industry, with big names such as Guerlain, Paco Rabanne, Lolita Lempicka, Jean-Charles de Castelbajac and Jean-Paul Gaultier. The Cosmetic Valley represents 2.5 billion euros of turnover, includes 200 companies, collaborates with the Universities of Orleans and Paris and employs more than 30,000 employees.
 The pharmaceutical industry, around Dreux and the Polepharma cluster. Created in 2002 under the leadership of CODEL Polepharma is a cluster of French pharmaceutical production which includes companies like Ipsen, Novo Nordisk, Laboratoires Expanscience, LEO Pharma, Ethypharm Famar, Norgine, Nypro, Synerlab / Sophartex and Seratec. The cluster represents 50% of drug production in France and 30,000 jobs. The Pharma cluster is also one of the creators of the inter-regional alliance "Pharma Valley" that has partner networks: Polepharma, CBS and Grepic. This alliance represents 60% of the production sites located in France and 2.5 billion euros of turnover.
 the agri-food industry, promoted by Agrodynamic (rural center of excellence), with two major companies in the sector: Ebly at Chateaudun and an Andros at Auneau.
 woodcraft and furniture industry around the association Perchebois.
 the rubber and plastics industry, through the cluster Elastopole.
 the elevator manufacturer Octé has its head office in Châteauneuf-en-Thymerais

Energy 
The department also has the lead in renewable energy. Already ranked second nationally in terms of power generation through its wind farms located in particular in the Beauce region of Eure-et-Loir in 2012 will be the largest producer of electricity with photovoltaic French original creation on the airbase NATO disused Crucey-Villages near Brezolles in the region's natural Thymerais, the largest photovoltaic park in France. Given in February 2011 by the General Council to the operator, EDF Energies Nouvelles, the park will cover 245 ha of the military base and produce the equivalent output of 160 wind turbines.

Politics
The President of the Departmental council is Christophe Le Dorven of The Republicans.

Presidential elections 2nd round

Current National Assembly Representatives

Tourism
 The most important tourist attraction is the cathedral of Chartres, with its magnificent stained-glass windows.
 Church: Saint-Pierre of Dreux, Saint-Denis (Toury)
 Chapelle Royale of Dreux
 Beffroi of Dreux
 Bonneval Abbey
 Castle of Anet, of Chateaudun, of Maillebois, of Maintenon, of Montigny (Cloyes-sur-Loir), of Montigny-sur-Avre, of Charbonnières (Authon-du-Perche), Castle Saint-John (Nogent-le-Rotrou), Castle of Villepion (Orgères-en-Beauce), Castle of Reverseaux (Voves)
 Regional parc of the Perche

Notable people

Middle Ages 
 Hasting, viking chief who was Count of Chartres (882 - 892)
 Hugues Capet (c. 939 – 996), King of the Franks, deceased near Voves
 Fulbert de Chartres (952-970 – 1028), bishop founder of School of Chartres
 Bernard of Tiron (1046 - 1117), founder of the monastic order of Tiron and of the abbey of Thiron-Gardais
 John of Salisbury (1115 - 1180), student of Abélard and of Fulbert de Chartres. British intellectual, friend of Thomas Becket. Bishop of Chartres from 1176 to 1180.
 Philippe VI of France (1293 – 1350), died at the Abbey of Notre-Dame of Coulombs, near Nogent-le-Roi
 Jean II of France (1319 – 1364), who signed the Treaty of Brétigny during the Hundred Years War at Sours, a village near Chartres

Renaissance 
 Joan of France, Duchess of Berry (1464 - 1505), born in Nogent-le-Roi, wife of Louis XII of France, canonised by the Pope Pius XII in 1950.
 Diane de Poitiers (1499 - 1566), favourite of Henry II of France
 Rémy Belleau (1526 - 1577), poet of the Pléiade
 Henri IV of France (1553 - 1610), crowned in Chartres Cathedral
 Jean Louis de Nogaret de La Valette (1554 – 1642), Duc d'Épernon, minion of Henri III of France.
 Maximilien de Béthune (1559 - 1641), duke of Sully-sur-Loire died at the Villebon château, buried at Nogent-le-Rotrou)

19th and 20th century 
Émile Zola (1840 – 1902), who was inspired by Romilly-sur-Aigre for his novel La Terre
Marcel Proust (1871 – 1922) spent time during his youth in the town Illiers-Combray where his aunt lived
Paul-Félix Armand-Delille (1874 – 1963), bacteriologist
Chaïm Soutine (1893 – 1943), painter
Simone Segouin (1925 -  ), also known by her nom de guerre Nicole Minet, is a former French Resistance fighter who served in the Francs-Tireurs et Partisans group.
Lolita Lempicka (1954 - ), fashion designer and perfumer who lives in Berchères-sur-Vesgre

Media
The media in Eure-et-Loir include the following:
Daily newspapers: L'Écho Républicain, La République du Centre
Weekly newspapers: Horizon (agricultural journal), L'Action Républicaine, Le Perche, L'Écho de Brou
Local radio and TV stations: Radio Intensité (Châteaudun), RTV (Dreux), Radio Grand Ciel

See also
Arrondissements of the Eure-et-Loir department
Cantons of the Eure-et-Loir department
Communes of the Eure-et-Loir department

References

External links

  Departmental council website
  Prefecture website

  
  Tourism website

 
1790 establishments in France
Departments of Centre-Val de Loire
States and territories established in 1790